Thill is a surname. Notable people with the surname include:

Francis Augustine Thill (1893–1957), American Roman Catholic bishop
Georges Thill (1897–1984), French opera singer
Lewis D. Thill (1903–1975), American politician
Roland Thill (1954–2017), Luxembourgish footballer
Agnès Thill (born 1964), French politician
Tom Thill (born 1990), Luxembourgish cyclist
Sébastien Thill (born 1993), Luxembourgish footballer
Olivier Thill (born 1996), Luxembourgish footballer
Vincent Thill (born 2000), Luxembourgish footballer